In enzymology, a 6-hydroxynicotinate dehydrogenase is an enzyme that catalyzes the chemical reaction

6-hydroxynicotinate + H2O + O2  2,6-dihydroxynicotinate + H2O2

The 3 substrates of this enzyme are 6-hydroxynicotinate, H2O, and O2, whereas its two products are 2,6-dihydroxynicotinate and H2O2.

This enzyme belongs to the family of oxidoreductases, specifically those acting on CH or CH2 groups with oxygen as acceptor. The systematic name of this enzyme class is 6-hydroxynicotinate:O2 oxidoreductase. Other names in common use include 6-hydroxynicotinic acid hydroxylase, 6-hydroxynicotinic acid dehydrogenase, and 6-hydroxynicotinate hydroxylase.

References

 
 

EC 1.17.3
Enzymes of unknown structure